Bathymargarites is a genus of extremely small deep water sea snails, marine gastropod mollusks in the family Seguenziidae.

Species
Species within the genus Bathymargarites include:
Bathymargarites symplector Warén & Bouchet, 1989

References

External links
 To GenBank 
 To World Register of Marine Species

 
Seguenziidae
Monotypic gastropod genera